The flag of Koryak Okrug, in the Russian Federation, is a vertical triband of teal and white charged in the center by a red reindeer head.

The flag was adopted on 13 July 1998. The proportions are 2:3.

References
Flags of the World.net: Flag of Koryak Okrug

Kamchatka Krai
Flags of the federal subjects of Russia
History of the Kamchatka Peninsula
Flag
Koryak
Koryak
Flags introduced in 1998